The James K.P. Wolfe House is a historic home in Frederick, Maryland. It is a two-story, frame, single hall plan, Victorian period farmhouse with Gothic Revival-style detailing.  It is a late-19th century example of the Maryland Piedmont farmhouse. The dwelling was built in 1889 by the Wolfe family, who owned the property until 1936.

It was listed on the National Register of Historic Places in 2002.

References

External links
, including photo in 2002, at Maryland Historical Trust

Houses on the National Register of Historic Places in Maryland
Gothic Revival architecture in Maryland
Houses completed in 1889
Houses in Frederick County, Maryland
National Register of Historic Places in Frederick County, Maryland
1889 establishments in Maryland